Five Man Acoustical Jam is a live album released in 1990 by the band Tesla, using acoustic guitars instead of the electric guitars for which pop-metal bands such as Tesla are traditionally known. The biggest hit from the album was the song "Signs", a cover version originally from the band Five Man Electrical Band, who also had a hit with the song. Other songs included "Love Song" and "The Way It Is" (hits from their previous album The Great Radio Controversy) and covers of The Rolling Stones' "Mother's Little Helper", Creedence Clearwater Revival's "Lodi", and The Beatles' "We Can Work It Out".

Background and recording
Tesla was originally reticent to perform an all-acoustic show.  They had performed an acoustic version of their hit "Love Song" at the 1990 Bammy Awards, a local music awards show in the San Francisco Bay Area sponsored by the indie music publication BAM.  The performance was so well received, that the band's co-manager Peter Mensch tried to get the band to perform an all-acoustic set during a lull in their touring schedule, while they were opening for Mötley Crüe on their 1990 Dr. Feelgood tour.  When Mensch brought up the idea, bassist Brian Wheat replied  "Fuck no! We’re a hard rock band, man!", though Mensch goaded them into developing a fully acoustic set by challenging their musical skill, claiming they were unable to pull it off.  The band developed a 90-minute set entirely performed on acoustic instruments, and after three days of rehearsal, debuted the set over two shows at Slim's in San Francisco just before the launch of the Mötley Crüe tour.  Given the strength of the two shows, four additional dates were booked during gaps in the tour, and the July 2 show in Philadelphia, Pennsylvania, at the Trocadero Theatre, was selected for recording for a potential live album, at the suggestion of Wheat.  The tapes from the show sat unused for two months, until a live performance of "Signs", recorded at WAAF in Boston, had become a big hit at that station.  The other co-manager Cliff Burnstein convinced Geffen Records to release the live recordings from the Trocadero show.  Initially envisioned as an EP, the band convinced Geffen to release it as a full LP.  In reviewing the tapes, Wheat's acoustic bass playing did not record well, so he re-recorded his parts in the studio, the only overdub work done on the original live recordings.  It was decided to title the album Five Man Acoustical Jam in honor of the Five Man Electrical Band, who had original performed the song "Signs" that Tesla covered on the album.  The album was released on November 9, 1990.

Track listing

Personnel
Tesla
 Jeff Keith – vocals, tambourine
 Tommy Skeoch – 6 & 12-string guitars, backing vocals
 Frank Hannon – 6-string & electric guitar, bottleneck guitar, blues harp, piano, organ, backing vocals
 Brian Wheat – hofner bass, piano, backing vocals
 Troy Luccketta – drums, percussion

Production
 Dan McClendon - engineer, producer
 Mike Beyer - engineer
 David Hewitt - engineer

Charts

Certifications

References

Tesla (band) albums
1990 live albums
Geffen Records live albums